Pisti (Aymara and Quechua for influenca, a common cold or plague, also spelled Piste) is a mountain in the Andes of Peru, about  high. It is located in the Apurímac Region, Antabamba Province, Sabaino District, and in the Aymaraes Province, on the border of the districts of Caraybamba and Chalhuanca. Pisti lies northwest of Kiswarani.

References 

Mountains of Peru
Mountains of Apurímac Region